Pascal Heije (born October 2, 1979) is a Dutch footballer currently under contract for Liga Primer Indonesia side Bali De Vata FC.

External links

1979 births
Living people
Dutch footballers
Dutch sportspeople of Surinamese descent
Dutch expatriate footballers
Association football midfielders
AFC Ajax players
RBC Roosendaal players
NEC Nijmegen players
Go Ahead Eagles players
APEP FC players
Negeri Sembilan FA players
Eredivisie players
Eerste Divisie players
Cypriot First Division players
Expatriate footballers in Cyprus
Expatriate footballers in Indonesia
Footballers from Amsterdam